Maria Argyra (also Argyre or Argyropoulina) (died 1006 or 1007), of the Argyros family, was the great-granddaughter of the Byzantine emperor Romanos I Lakapenos, cousin of the emperors Basil II and Constantine VIII, and sister to the Byzantine emperor Romanos III Argyros.

In the Chronicon Venetum by John the Deacon, it is mentioned that Maria was the daughter of a noble patrician, called Argyropoulos, who was a descendant of the imperial family. This information is confirmed by the chronicle of Andrea Dandolo, who says that she was the niece of the emperor Basil II. More precisely, she was the sister of the future emperor Romanos III Argyros and the daughter of (Marianos?) Argyros, the son of Romanos Argyros and Agathe, daughter of the emperor Romanos I Lakapenos. This made her the second cousin of the emperors Basil II and Constantine VIII, likewise great-grandchildren of Romanos I, through another of his daughters, Helene.

In 1004 Maria was married to Giovanni Orseolo, the son of the Doge of Venice Pietro II Orseolo, in the Iconomium palace  in Constantinople with full imperial pageantry – the couple was crowned with golden diadems by Basil II. Maria brought to her husband great dowry, including a palace in the imperial capital, where they lived after the wedding. Basil also honored Maria's husband with the title of patrician.
  
Before they left Constantinople, Maria Argyra was already pregnant and begged the emperor for pieces of the holy relics of Saint Barbara, which were brought to Venice by her. Maria Argyre and Giovanni Orseolo had a son, Basilio, who was named after his uncle, Maria's brother Basileios Argyros-Mesardonites or Emperor Basil II, or both.

In 1006 or 1007 Maria, along with her husband and son, died when plague swept through the city-state.

Half a century after her death, she was criticised by Peter Damian for her use of a fork for eating (forks being unfamiliar in Western Europe at the time), perfumes, and dew for bathing.

Sources

Kaldellis, Anthony (2017) Streams of Gold, Rivers of Blood: The Rise and Fall of Byzantium, 955 A.D. to the First Crusade, Oxford.

Norwich, John Julius (1991) Byzantium: The Apogee, London: BCA.

References 

1007 deaths
11th-century deaths from plague (disease)
10th-century births
Maria
11th-century Byzantine people
11th-century Venetian people
11th-century Byzantine women
11th-century Venetian women